Periclimenella is a genus of shrimps belonging to the family Palaemonidae.

The species of this genus are found in Indian Ocean, Southeastern Asia and Australia.

Species:

Periclimenella agattii 
Periclimenella petitthouarsii 
Periclimenella spinifera

References

Palaemonidae